Lakhimpur Assembly constituency may refer to 
 Lakhimpur, Uttar Pradesh Assembly constituency
 Lakhimpur, Assam Assembly constituency